The Monument to General Perón is an instance of public art in Madrid, Spain.

History and description 
According to the Argentine ambassador in Spain, the project was reportedly the first monument dedicated to Perón to be erected outside Argentina's borders. The monument was a token of gratitude for the support provided by Perón to the Francoist regime during the immediate period after World War II, amid the international isolation of the dictatorship.

Designed by Agustín de la Herrán, the full-body leading sculpture, cast in bronze and 2.10 metre high, represents a standing Perón, dressed with a full dress uniform and carrying the presidential staff. The design of the granite plinth was entrusted to a municipal architect of the Ayuntamiento de Madrid.

Before the inauguration, authorities paid a visit to the nearby Monument to Isabella the Catholic in order to deposit a floral tribute.

References 

Outdoor sculptures in Madrid
Bronze sculptures in Spain
Sculptures of men in Spain
Statues of presidents
Statues of military officers
Buildings and structures in Cuatro Caminos neighborhood, Madrid
Monuments and memorials in Madrid
Juan Perón